Edward Coleman (died January 12, 1839) was the founder of the Forty Thieves, alleged to be the oldest criminal gang in New York City and the first Irish gang with an established leader. He became one of New York City's most notorious villains, for the murder of his wife and popular Five Points character known as "The Pretty Hot Corn Girl". 

An early New York gangster, Coleman was the original leader of the Forty Thieves, helping form the gang in 1826. Coleman continued to control the Five Points with the gang for over fifteen years before courting and eventually marrying a "Hot Corn Girl" named Ann in 1838. As her husband, Coleman was entitled to her earnings; however, when she did not earn as much as expected, Coleman beat her so severely she later died from her wounds. Coleman was quickly arrested and convicted of murder in early January 1839, and on January 12, 1839, Coleman became the first man to be hanged at the newly constructed Tombs Prison (built in 1838).

Although journalist and author Herbert Asbury, in his popular 1928 book The Gangs of New York, describes Edward Coleman as an early chieftain of the Forty Thieves Gang, which is implied to be a predominantly Irish gang, contemporary papers describe Coleman as a "black man." His wife, Ann, is herself described as either "colored" or "mulatto." Furthermore, the papers ascribe jealousy and infidelity as the motive for the murder, rather than anything financial, quoting Edward himself as saying he killed her "because she slept with another man." Finally, the contemporary accounts have Edward Coleman cutting his wife's throat with such ferocity that she was nearly decapitated, rather than beating her to death.

See also
 Capital punishment in New York (state)
 Capital punishment in the United States
 List of people executed in New York

References

Asbury, Herbert. The Gangs of New York. New York: Alfred A. Knopf, 1928. 
Sifakis, Carl. Encyclopedia of American Crime, Facts On File, Inc.:  New York, 1982.

External links
Edward Coleman and his wife, "Hot Corn Girl", "Landmarks of Crime Paradise Square", Mike Shayne Private Eye #1 (1962) (Comic Book)

Year of birth missing
1839 deaths
1826 crimes in the United States
19th-century executions by New York (state)
Gang members of New York City
American people convicted of murder
American people executed for murder
19th-century executions by the United States
People executed by New York (state) by hanging
19th-century executions of American people
People convicted of murder by New York (state)
Executed gangsters
1838 murders in the United States